Thirty Cases of Major Zeman (Třicet případů majora Zemana) is a Czechoslovak action-drama television show intended as a political propaganda to support the official attitude of the Communist Party of Czechoslovakia. The series were filmed in the 1970s.

Each episode encompasses one year, and investigations are stylized to that year. Most are inspired by real cases. The series follows the life of police investigator Jan Zeman during his career from 1945 to 1973.

Controversy 
A re-broadcast of the series in the Czech Republic in 1999, caused controversy and public criticism about the series, which was accused of conveying communist propaganda and portraying those who think differently politically as criminals.

Plot of the first episode

The first episode takes place in 1945. Young Jan Zeman is returning from a Nazi concentration camp. On the train he meets Václav Kalina, who tells him about his plan to join the police force. Jan returns to his home village and finds only his mother there. He discovers that his father has been murdered during the celebrations. The police are unable to find the murderer and close the case. Jan begins investigating on his own. He reveals a conspiracy and calls his friend Václav Kalina at Brno police headquarters; eventually, the murderers are captured. Kalina induces Jan to join the police and serve with him.

List of episodes

See also
 Comrade Detective, a show that parodies propaganda series like Major Zeman

References

External links
 
  CSFD Entry
  Fan site

1975 Czechoslovak television series debuts
Czechoslovak television series
Czech action television series
Czech crime television series
1970s Czechoslovak television series
Propaganda television broadcasts
Czechoslovak Television original programming